Vitznau railway station is a railway station and ferry terminal in the municipality of Vitznau, in the Swiss canton of Lucerne. It is the terminus of the standard gauge Vitznau–Rigi line of Rigi Railways.

Layout 
The railway portion of the station has a single island platform with two tracks. A turntable allows trains to reach the Rigi Railways depot, adjacent to the station but at almost a ninety-degree angle from it, parallel to Lake Lucerne. The Lake Lucerne Navigation Company station building and piers are adjacent as well, on the shores of the lake. Auto AG Schwyz buses load and unload on Seestrasse, to the rear of the station facilities.

Services 
 the following services stop at Vitznau:

 Lake Lucerne Navigation Company: hourly service between Luzern Bahnhofquai and Brunnen; some ships continue from Brunnen to Flüelen.

References

External links 
 
 

Railway stations in the canton of Lucerne
Ferry terminals in Switzerland